Vidnava is a town in Jeseník District in the Olomouc Region of the Czech Republic. It has about 1,200 inhabitants. The historic town centre is well preserved and is protected by law as an urban monument zone.

Etymology

The town's name is derived from the name of the Vidnavka River. The name of the river has its origin in vidět (i.e. "to see"), which was derived from the clear water through which it could be seen. The town's name first appeared written as Wydna and Widna. The German name arose from the distortion of the Czech name, and the similarity with the word weide (i.e. "willow") is accidental. Nevertheless, the willow appeared on the coat of arms.

Geography
It lies in the Vidnava Lowland, on the right bank of the river Vidnavka.

History
The first written mention of Vidnava is from 1291. The town prospered until the Hussite Wars, during which in 1628 it was conquered and burned. Vidnava did not recover until the early 16th century, when there was a boom in crafts. The town was again destroyed by a large fire in 1574, and then during the Thirty Years' War, when it was conquered by the Swedish army several times.

The history of the town was influenced by the War of the Austrian Succession in 1741–1745. The newly established borders of Silesia made Vidnava a border town, cut off from the rich villages to the east of it.

After the construction of the railway at the end of the 19th century, Vidnava became a railway junction for freight transport from Czechoslovakia to Poland, but this ended with the World War II, when the railway bridge over the river Vidnavka was destroyed in 1945.

During the World War II, the German occupiers operated the E780 forced labour subcamp and the E214 subcamp of the Stalag VIII-B/344 prisoner-of-war camp in Vidnava. Four PoWs who were killed by the Germans during escape attempts were buried at the Catholic cemetery in Vidnava. For many prisoners of war, Vidnava was a stopping place on The March during the final months of the World War II in Europe. A memorial dedicated to 19 victims of The March is on local cemetery.

From 1976 to 1990, Velká Kraš was an administrative part of Vidnava.

Demographics

Sights

The historic town centre is delimited by the preserved remains of the late medieval town fortifications from the 15th and the 16th centuries. The town square is lined by medieval houses with late Baroque and Empire gables.

The landmark is the Church of Saint Catherine of Alexandria. It was originally a Gothic church, founded together with the town in the 13th century. Today's appearance is the result of Baroque and Neoclassical reconstructions. The last major reconstruction took place in 1883, when a neo-Gothic tower was added.

The Renaissance one-storey Vidnava Castle comes from the second half of the 16th century. It has two towers decorated with sgraffito. Today it houses an elementary art school.

Notable people
Adolf Lorenz (1854–1946), Austrian orthopedic surgeon
Friedrich Karl Max Vierhapper (1876–1932), Austrian botanist

Twin towns – sister cities

Vidnava is twinned with:
 Neuburg an der Donau, Germany

References

External links

Populated places in Jeseník District
Cities and towns in the Czech Republic
Czech Silesia